Endoxyla celebesa is a moth in the family Cossidae. It is found on Sulawesi.

References

Endoxyla (moth)
Moths described in 1865